Vladislav Chernyshov (born 16 March 1981) is a Kazakh-Kyrgyz footballer who last played for Kazakhstan Premier League club FC Irtysh Pavlodar as a defender. He played for the Kyrgyzstan olympic football team until 2002. In October 2010 he was called up to Kazakhstan national football team for the first time.

He appeared twice for the Kazakhstan national team in 2011.

Career statistics

Honours
Dinamo-Polyot Bishkek
Kyrgyzstan League (2): 1998, 1999

Alga Bishkek
Kyrgyzstan League (2): 2001, 2002
Kyrgyzstan Cup (1): 2002

Irtysh Pavlodar
Kazakhstan Premier League (1): 2003

References

External links
Player profile at FC Irtysh official website

1981 births
Living people
Kazakhstan international footballers
Kyrgyzstani expatriate footballers
Association football defenders
Kazakhstan Premier League players
FC Irtysh Pavlodar players
Expatriate footballers in Kazakhstan
Kyrgyzstani footballers
Kyrgyzstani expatriate sportspeople in Kazakhstan
Kazakhstani footballers